List of British banknotes and coins, with commonly used terms.

Coins

Pre-decimal
Prior to decimalisation in 1971, there were 12 pence (written as 12d) in a shilling (written as 1s or 1/-) and 20 shillings in a pound, written as £1 (occasionally "L" was used instead of the pound sign, £). There were therefore 240 pence in a pound. For example, 2 pounds 14 shillings and 5 pence could have been written as £2 14s 5d or £2/14/5.

The value of some coins fluctuated, particularly in the reigns of James I and Charles I. The value of a guinea fluctuated between 20 and 30 shillings before being fixed at 21 shillings in December 1717. These are denominations of British, or earlier English, coins – Scottish coins had different values.

Notes:

Decimal

Since decimalisation on "Decimal Day", 15 February 1971, the pound has been divided into 100 pence. Originally the term "new pence" was used; the word "new" was dropped from the coinage in 1983. The old shilling equated to five (new) pence, and, for example, £2 10s 6d became . The symbol for the (old) penny, "d", was replaced by "p" (or initially sometimes "np", for new pence). Thus 72 pence can be written as £0.72 or 72p; both were commonly read as "seventy-two pee".

Banknotes
Main articles: Banknotes of the pound sterling and Bank of England note issues.

Note: The description of banknotes given here relates to notes issued by the Bank of England. Three banks in Scotland and four banks in Northern Ireland also issue notes, in some or all of the denominations: £1, £5, £10, £20, £50, £100.

Bank of England notes are periodically redesigned and reissued, with the old notes being withdrawn from circulation and destroyed. Each redesign is allocated a "series". Currently the £50 note is "series F" issue whilst the £5, £10 and £20 notes are "series G" issue. Series G is the latest round of redesign, which commenced in September 2016 with the polymer £5 note, September 2017 with the polymer £10 note, and February 2020 with the polymer £20 note.

References

External links

The Royal Mint UK coins
Coins from United Kingdom - Online Coin Club
Bank of England: banknotes

Bank notes and coins
British bank notes and coins
Bank notes and coins
British bank notes and coins
Pound sterling